Batrovci is a village located in the municipality of Šid, Srem District, Vojvodina, Serbia. As of 2011, it has a population of 259 inhabitants. A border crossing between Serbia and Croatia is located in the village, on European route E70.

Name
The name of the village in Serbian is plural.

Historical population
 1961: 653
 1971: 577
 1981: 464
 1991: 399
 2002: 320
 2011: 259

See also
 List of places in Serbia
 List of cities, towns and villages in Vojvodina
 Spačva basin

References
 Slobodan Ćurčić, Broj stanovnika Vojvodine, Novi Sad, 1996.

External links
 Batrovci Customs Details

Populated places in Syrmia
Croatia–Serbia border crossings